Palamós is a town and municipality in the Mediterranean Costa Brava, located in the comarca of Baix Empordà, in the province of Girona, Catalonia, Spain. Palamós is located at the northern end of a large bay. The town is by-passed by the C31 which connects the coastal towns of the central Costa Brava with Girona.

Palamós is a staging point on the GR 92 long distance footpath, which runs the length of the Mediterranean coast of Spain.

History
Dating from the 3rd or 2nd millennium BC, this has 3 slabs in their original state and the remains of a tomb that these once covered.

The Castell de la Fosca is a stone settlement of the Iberian Indigetes people which seems to have been inhabited from the 6th century BC to the 1st century AD.

Further south than the Castell de la Fosca, but still north of the current town and port, is the Castell de Sant Esteve de Mar. Archaeological evidence suggests that this site was occupied from the Roman period, and that the site was fortified in the twelfth century AD. By the thirteenth century, Peter II of Barcelona (also known as Peter III of Aragon) was looking to found a new port on the coast as the previous royal port in the region at Torroella de Montgrí on the River Ter had silted up. In 1277, he bought the castle and its estate, which included the site of the current port, with that in mind. As a consequence of the purchase, Palamos was founded and recognised as a village on 3 December 1279.

The site of the current port was used during the Roman period and before, but it was then disused until it was rebuilt after Peter's purchase of 1277. In 1285, the Battle of Les Formigues was fought near the Formigues Islands, just offshore from Palamós, resulting in a victory for the Catalan fleet over the French.

Palamós was the birthplace of Frederic Pujulà i Vallès (1877-1962), a journalist and dramatist who was a pioneer of Esperanto literature.

Palamós was served by the  gauge Palamós–Girona–Banyoles railway, which reached a junction with the Barcelona–Cerbère railway at Flaçà by 1887 and was extended to Girona by 1921. Service on the line continued until 1956.

Economy
The town is a major port (with the closure of Sant Feliu de Guíxols the only commercial harbour in the Province of Girona) with one of the last remaining fishing fleets on this part of the Mediterranean coast. It is famous for the locally caught prawns from Palamós.

The town's major economic activities until the second half of the 20th century were fishing and cork manufacturing. In the sixties, however, the town saw a rapid growth of tourism. The architecture of Palamos itself remained relatively unchanged with most development focused to the south at Sant Antoni de Calonge which now merges with Palamos. The bay between the two is popular for sailing, swimming and windsurfing. The town's nightlife is focused on the old port which is surrounded by bars and restaurants.

Sport
The town is home to Palamós CF the local football club. They share their ground, the Estadi Palamós Costa Brava with the small, but over-achieving club UE Llagostera, as the club's stadium, Estadi Municipal de Llagostera, didn't meet the LFP criteria.

Gallery

References

Bibliography
 Panareda Clopés, Josep Maria; Rios Calvet, Jaume; Rabella Vives, Josep Maria (1989). Guia de Catalunya, Barcelona: Caixa de Catalunya.  (Spanish).  (Catalan).

External links

 Official website
 Government data pages 

Municipalities in Baix Empordà
1279 establishments in Europe
Populated places in Baix Empordà
Seaside resorts in Spain
13th-century establishments in Aragon